The  is a streetcar line of Hiroshima Electric Railway (Hiroden) in Hiroshima, Japan. The line has been operating since 1943.

Routes 6, 8, and 9 operate on the line. The line has seven stations, with six of them numbered E1 through E6. The seventh station, Dobashi, is numbered M13, and is the station where the Eba Line merges with the Hiroden Main Line.

Stations

References

Eba Line
Railway lines opened in 1943